Sarah Kemp (born Gypsie Mary Kemp, 24 February 1937 – 9 January 2015) was an Australian-born actress, who started her acting career in the United Kingdom, she was best known for starring in the Australian soap opera Sons and Daughters, playing the character of dizzy socialite Charlie Bartlett, from 1982 to 1987.

Career
Kemp, who was born as Gypsie Mary Kemp in 1937, started her career in the United Kingdom, with credits including the film A Touch of the Other (1970), two episodes of the Doctor Who story Day of the Daleks (1972), and a 1972 episode of The Benny Hill Show. She was in the series Shoestring, which appeared on BBC television between 1979 and 1980, an Australian hitchhiker. She then returned to Australia and starred in Sons and Daughters. She appeared in Sporting Chance in 1981. Her last credited role was in the TV movie Mercy Mission: The Rescue of Flight 771 in 1993. She quit acting and worked as an English teacher.

Political
Kemp ran for the seat of Bennelong in the 1998 Australian federal election on the Unity Party ticket and also ran New South Wales Legislative Council in 1999 also on the Unity ticket.

Death
Kemp died at Bellingen Hospital in New South Wales on 9 January 2015, due to lung cancer, aged 77.

Filmography (selected)

See also
 2015 in Australian television

References

External links
 

1937 births
2015 deaths
Australian television actresses
Australian people of English descent
Deaths from lung cancer
Deaths from cancer in New South Wales